Huilongguan Station is a station on Line 13 of the Beijing Subway, located in the Huilongguan residential area of Changping District.

Station Layout 
The station has at-grade dual-island platforms with a track at the middle. Some eastbound trains terminate at the centre track, whilst regular trains operate on the 2 outer tracks.

Exits 
There are 2 exits, lettered A1 and A2. Both are accessible.

References

External links

Beijing Subway stations in Changping District